Renata Strašek (born April 8, 1972 in Celje) is a retired female  javelin thrower from Slovenia. She set her personal best (64.68 metres) in 1995 with the old javelin type.

International competitions

References

 sports-reference

1972 births
Living people
Sportspeople from Celje
Slovenian female javelin throwers
Olympic athletes of Slovenia
Athletes (track and field) at the 1996 Summer Olympics
World Athletics Championships athletes for Slovenia
Mediterranean Games bronze medalists for Slovenia
Mediterranean Games medalists in athletics
Athletes (track and field) at the 1993 Mediterranean Games